Khanqah-e-Niazia is a notable Dargah in Bareilly in Uttar Pradesh, it was established by Shah Niyaz Ahmad in the year 1773 AD.

References

Dargahs
Dargahs in India